Grevillea kenneallyi is a species of flowering plant in the family Proteaceae and is endemic to the south-west of Western Australia. It is a dense, spreading shrub with divided leaves, the end lobes more or less linear, and clusters of white flowers.

Description
The leaflets have a silky-hairy longitudinal groove on the lower surface.

Taxonomy
Grevillea kenneallyi was first formally described in 1986 by Donald McGillivray in his New Names in Grevillea (Proteaceae) from specimens collected by Roger Coveny near Wongan Hills in 1976. The specific epithet (kenneallyi) honours the botanist Kevin Francis Kenneally.

Distribution and habitat
This grevillea grows in woodland or shrubland in a small area between Wongan Hills, Piawaning and Ballidu in the Avon Wheatbelt bioregion of south-western Western Australia.

Conservation status
Grevillea kenneallyi is listed as "Priority Two" by the Western Australian Government Department of Biodiversity, Conservation and Attractions, meaning that it is poorly known and from only one or a few locations.

References

kenneallyi
Proteales of Australia
Flora of Western Australia
Taxa named by Donald McGillivray
Plants described in 1986